Amberley Wild Brooks or Amberley Wildbrooks is a  biological Site of Special Scientific Interest west of Storrington in West Sussex. It is also part of the Arun Valley Ramsar site, Special Area of Conservation and Special Protection Area.

This area of grazing marsh, which is dissected by drainage ditches, has a number of uncommon invertebrates, particularly dragonflies, and 156 species of flowering plants have been recorded. It is also important for wintering birds, with nationally significant numbers of teal, shoveler and Bewick’s swan. There are two rare snails, Anisus vorticulus and Pseudamnicola confusa.

References

Sussex Wildlife Trust
Sites of Special Scientific Interest in West Sussex